The Ministry of Trade and Industry (MTI; ;) is a ministry of the Government of Singapore responsible for the formulation and implementation of policies related to the development of business, trade and industry in Singapore.

Ministers 
The Ministry is headed by the Minister for Trade and Industry, who is appointed as part of the Cabinet of Singapore. The incumbent minister is Gan Kim Yong from the People's Action Party.

References

External links 
 

Trade and Industry
Foreign trade of Singapore
Singapore
Singapore
1979 establishments in Singapore
Singapore